Carousel Theater may refer to:

 Carousel Theater, a theatre in the round located in Framingham, Massachusetts, USA.
 A show building located in California's Disneyland that has housed the following attractions:
 Carousel of Progress (1967–73)
 America Sings (1974–88)
 Innoventions (1998–present)
 The show building located in Florida's Walt Disney World that has housed the Carousel of Progress since 1975.